Rexhep is an Albanian masculine given name. People bearing the name include:

Rexhep Pasha Mati (1842–1908), Ottoman marshal, governor, war minister, revolutionary
Rexhep Demi (1864–1929), member of the Albanian independence movement, politician
Rexhep Jella, Albanian politician, former mayor of Tirana
Rexhep Jusufi (died 1943), Albanian-Yugoslav World War II partisan 
Rexhep Maçi (1912–1980), Albanian football player 
Rexhep Meidani (born 1944),  Albanian politician, third President of Albania
Rexhep Mitrovica (1887–1967), Albanian politician, 18th Prime Minister of Albania
Rexhep Qosja (born 1936), Albanian politician and literary critic
Rexhep Voka (1847–1917), Albanian writer, activist and scholar

Albanian masculine given names